Jimmy Stewart (1908–1997) was an American actor and military officer.

Jimmy Stewart may also refer to:

Politics
 James Stewart (Irish politician) (1934–2013), known as Jimmy Stewart, Irish communist activist
 Jimmy Stewart (politician) (born 1969), Ohio State Representative

Sports
 Jimmy Stewart (racing driver) (1931–2008), Scottish Formula One driver
 Jimmy Stewart (baseball) (1939–2012), baseball player
 Jimmy Stewart (American football), former Southern Methodist University football coach

Other
 Stewart Granger or Jimmy Stewart (1913–1993), English actor
 Jimmy Stewart (musician) (born 1937), American jazz guitarist
 Jimmy Stewart (meteorologist) (born 1941), KVOA chief meteorologist
 Jimmy G. Stewart (1942–1966), US Army Medal of Honor recipient, killed in action

See also
 James Stewart (disambiguation)
 Jim Stewart (disambiguation)
 The Jimmy Stewart Show, a television series starring Jimmy Stewart
 The Jimmy Stewart Museum, a museum dedicated to Jimmy Stewart